The Plastics 2020 Challenge is a campaign to reduce the quantity of plastic waste sent to landfill. In 2009, the plastics industry, PlasticsEurope, the Packaging and Films Association (PAFA) and the British Plastics Federation (BPF), launched its Plastics 2020 Challenge campaign in the UK to challenge itself, consumers and government to step up resource efficiency and stop sending plastic materials to landfill. The Plastics 2020 Challenge was named runner-up "Campaign of the Year" for 2009 by Packaging News.

Pledges
The industry is pledging several commitments including to help double the recycling rate of plastic packaging in the UK by the year 2020 and the diversion of plastics from landfill.

Plastic recycling
Plastics are too valuable a resource to send to landfill at their end of life. Industry wants these materials back to recycle whenever possible. When plastics cannot be sustainably recycled such non-recyclable plastics provides a valuable energy resource for thermal process, contributing to energy security and displacing virgin fossil fuels.

Call for action
The plastics industry cannot achieve this alone, and calls on policy makers and the value chain to work with them in achieving its goal, thereby increasing the UK's resource efficiency and creating new jobs in the Green sector.

Sponsors
The Plastics 2020 Challenge is sponsored by three organisations:
 PlasticsEurope
 British Plastics Federation (BPF)
 Packaging and Films Association (PAFA)

See also
 Plastic recycling
 Reuse of water bottles
 Waste Implementation Programme
 Department for Environment, Food and Rural Affairs

References

External links
 

2009 in the environment
Recycling in the United Kingdom
Plastic recycling